The 6th Armoured Division is a Pakistan Army armoured division currently based in Gujranwala, in Punjab Province.

History

Formation
The division was originally an armoured brigade known as the 100 Independent Armoured Brigade Group.  In 1964, it was decided to use the headquarters and other assets of this formation to create a new armoured division.  It was still in the process of raising when the 1965 war against India broke out.

1965 War

The formation would see its first taste of action in Operation Grand Slam in Chamb sector where it was the armoured contingent. However the general weakness of Pakistan Army defence around Sialkot and the fact that war was expected to break out over the international border, meant that the division would see only a few days of fighting before it was sent to Sialkot, where it would earn its spurs at a village called Chawinda.  On 8 September the Indian attack came and thus began the Battle of Chawinda.  Initially the division was surprised and outflanked by the Indians as the enemy chose an unexpected axis to attack. Desperate holding actions by some individual units, famously, the 25th Cavalry (of the 15th Infantry Division), would hamper its advance. A battle ensued against the Indians at Phillora (Phillaurah) resultin in a loss of 66 tanks.
The 6th Armoured Division then settled in defensive positions around Chawinda alongside other divisions, withstood multiple corps sized attacks by the Indian I Corps, until the biggest on 18 September when the Indian 1st Armoured and 6th Mountain divisions attacked, and would be destroyed. The Indians than went on the defensive as the 6th and its sister formations steadily and remorselessly forced them back across the international border; a task which was mostly (though not completely) completed by the ceasefire on 23 September.

The divisions' action at Chawinda remains its most famous action.  This battle was the largest tank battle since Kursk in 1943 and has been forever associated with the 6th.  Amongst the many commendations received was one by the President which read:

The President of Pakistan has commanded that his personal congratulations be conveyed to All Ranks under your command for the exemplary, successful and courageous battle that they have fought. The President and the whole Nation are proud of these untarnishable deeds of valour.

Present Order of Battle
The division is at present stationed in Gujranwala and has four armoured brigades attached.

HQ 6 Armoured Division, Gujranwala
7th Armoured Brigade, Gujranwala
9th Armoured Brigade, Gujranawala
11th Armoured Brigade, Gujranwala
8th Armoured Brigade Group, Mangla (wartime only, normally under corps control)
106 Air Defence Brigade
One of the regiments of the division is reportedly the 29th Cavalry.
In addition the following units are attached and stationed in Kharain.

6 Armoured Division Support troops (a brigades worth of troops, mostly engineers, signal and other logistic troops)
314 Assault Engineers
6 Armoured Division Artillery (Equivalent to a Brigade)
6 Armoured Div Aviation Air Brigade (wartime only, ordinarily units are dispersed)

References 

 Brian Cloughley: A History of Pakistan Army
 http://www.orbat.com

External links 
 Information from Global Security

Divisions of the Pakistan Army
Military units and formations established in 1965